Tindill is a surname. Notable people with the surname include:

Bert Tindill (1926–1973), English footballer
Eric Tindill (1910–2010), New Zealand sportsman 
Paul Tindill (born 1939), New Zealand cricketer, son of Eric

See also
Tindal (disambiguation)